Songs Are Our Universe is a posthumous retrospective/rare tracks collection for the Japanese band Super Junky Monkey. It is a double-CD set, and was released in 2001. It also features some bonus videos.

It is considered by some to be a good introduction to the band. It is currently out of print.

Track listing

Disc 1
Super Junky Monkey Theme
R.P.G
Blah, Blah, Blah
Nani (What)
Gokai (Misunderstanding)
Bakabatka (All Stupid)
A¥I¥E¥T¥O¥H
Skysurfer Strike Force
Tell Me Your All
Start With Makin’ A Fire
Tamage
I Call Myself “Sliced Ice”
Kioku No Netsuzou (Spit Bug) (Fabrication Of Memory)
Where’re The Good Times
Decide
Popobar
QuickTime Movies:
Buckin’ The Bolts (live)
RPG
We’re The Mother
Decide (live)

Disc 2
Parasitic People
The Words
Zakuro No Hone (Bone Of Pomegranate)
I Got The Third
Seven
Genshi No Sairai (New Song)
Shower
If
We’re The Mother
Love & Peace Hard Core
QuickTime Movies:
Towering Man (live)

Info
Tracks off of Cabbage: Disc 1: 1
Tracks off of Screw Up: Disc 1:6,11,13,14,15,16 Disc 2:3,7,9
Tracks off of Parasitic People: Disc 1: 4,5,10 Disc 2:1,2,6,8
Tracks off of AIETOH: Disc 1: 3,7
Tracks off of Super Junky Alien: Disc 1: 2 Disc 2: 4,5,10
Previously unreleased tracks: Disc 1: 8,9

References

2001 compilation albums
Super Junky Monkey albums